The Colville River is a 60-mile (100 km) long tributary of the Columbia River in northeastern Washington in the United States.

Course
The Colville River begins in southern Stevens County, Washington at the confluence of Sheep Creek and Deer Creek. It flows northwest past Colville and into the Columbia River near Kettle Falls.

See also
 Tributaries of the Columbia River
 List of rivers of Washington

References

Rivers of Washington (state)
Tributaries of the Columbia River
Rivers of Stevens County, Washington